The 1996–97 Armenian Cup was the sixth edition of the Armenian Cup, a football competition. In 1996–97, the tournament had 24 participants, none of which were reserve teams.

Results

First round
FC Yerevan, Karabakh Yerevan, Pyunik, Van Yerevan, Kotayk, Tsement, Shirak and Ararat Yerevan received byes to the second round.

The first legs were played on 1 and 2 October 1996. The second legs were played on 9 and 10 October 1996.

|}

Second round
The first legs were played on 19, 20 October and 2 November 1996. The second legs were played on 2, 3 and 14 November 1996.

|}

Quarter-finals
The first legs were played on 26 March 1997. The second legs were played on 8 April 1997.

|}

Semi-finals
The first legs were played on 13 May 1997. The second legs were played on 18 May 1997.

|}

Final

See also
 1996–97 Armenian Premier League

External links
 1996–97 Armenian Cup at rsssf.com

Armenian Cup seasons
Armenia
Armenian Cup, 1997
Armenian Cup, 1997